Sheykhan or Shaikhan may refer to various places in Iran:
 Sheykhan, Gilan
 Shaikhan, Dalahu, Kermanshah Province
 Sheykhan, Kurdistan, Iran
 Sheykhan, Razavi Khorasan
 Sheykhan Karag, Sistan and Baluchestan Province
 Sheykhan, South Khorasan
 Sheykhan, Mahabad, West Azerbaijan Province
 Sheykhan, Oshnavieh, West Azerbaijan Province
 Sheykhan-e Davud Khuni

See also
 Deh-e Sheykhan (disambiguation)
 Sheikhan, in Pakistan